Karl Friedrich Adolf Wuttke (10 November 181912 April 1870) was a German Protestant theologian.

Biography
He was born in Breslau (Wrocław). He studied theology at Breslau, Berlin and Halle, where he eventually became professor ordinarius.

Works
He is known as the author of a treatise on Christian ethics (Handbuch der christlichen Sittenlehre, 1860-1863) and works on heathen religion (Die Geschichte des Heidentums, 1851-1853) and superstition (Der deutsche Volksaberglaube der Gegenwart, 1865).

References

External links

1819 births
1870 deaths
German Lutheran theologians
19th-century German Protestant theologians
Academic staff of the University of Wrocław
People from the Province of Silesia
Prussian politicians
University of Breslau alumni
Humboldt University of Berlin alumni
Martin Luther University of Halle-Wittenberg alumni
Academic staff of the Martin Luther University of Halle-Wittenberg
19th-century German male writers
German male non-fiction writers
19th-century Lutherans